Rodolfo Rivademar (October 19, 1927 – October 15, 2013) was an Argentine sailor and Olympic medalist. He was a member of the Argentine crew on Djinn that received a silver medal in the 6 metre class  at the 1948 Summer Olympics in London.

References

1927 births
2013 deaths
Argentine male sailors (sport)
Olympic sailors of Argentina
Olympic silver medalists for Argentina
Olympic medalists in sailing
Sailors at the 1948 Summer Olympics – 6 Metre
Sailors at the 1964 Summer Olympics – Dragon
Medalists at the 1948 Summer Olympics